Abbott Island is an island of the Wessel Islands in the Northern Territory of Australia.

References

External links
Wessel Islands map

Islands of the Northern Territory